Rosie Jimenez (August 5, 1950 – October 3, 1977), also known as Rosaura Jimenez, is the first woman known to have died in the United States due to an unsafe abortion after the Hyde Amendment was passed, which, in 1977, cut off Medicaid funding for safe medically-supervised abortions. Unable to afford a safe and legal abortion at a clinic, Jimenez sought out a cheaper and unsafe abortion. She died at age 27 from an infection in McAllen, Texas. At the time, she was a student who would have earned a teaching credential in six months, as well as the single mother of a five-year-old daughter.

The book ROSIE: The Investigation of a Wrongful Death (1979), by Ellen Frankfort, with Frances Kissling, is about Jimenez. Five percent of the royalties of that book were planned to be contributed to the Rosie Jimenez Fund of financial assistance to poor women wishing to have abortions in Texas.

A 1995 compilation album issued by 550 Music/Epic Records called Spirit of '73: Rock For Choice was put together by the activist group Feminist Majority, and the liner notes state that the proceeds of the album went to supporting the Becky Bell/Rosie Jimenez Campaign "to lift consent laws and federal funding restrictions that are forcing young women to turn to back-alley abortions".

Since 1995, the Abortion Access Project has organized Rosie Jimenez Day every October 3, as well as sponsored speak-outs and other events every year that month to remember her.

Activism of the Socialist Party of Massachusetts includes, among other things, annual demonstrations to mark Rosie Jimenez Day.

See also
 Abortion in the United States
 Becky Bell
 Gerri Santoro

References

1950 births
1977 deaths
Abortion in the United States
American people of Mexican descent
Accidental deaths in Texas